Fredonia is a town and municipality in the Colombian department of Antioquia. Part of the subregion of Southwestern Antioquia.

References

References 
http://www.fredonia-antioquia.gov.co/index.shtml#2 (In Spanish)

Municipalities of Antioquia Department